Mohamed Abdel Ghani (born 16 July 1993) is an Egyptian professional footballer who plays as a centre-back for Egyptian Premier League club Zamalek.

Honours
Zamalek
Egyptian Premier League 2020-21, 2021-22
Egypt Cup: 2018, 2019, 2021
Egyptian Super Cup: 2019–20
Saudi-Egyptian Super Cup: 2018
CAF Confederation Cup: 2018–19
 CAF Super Cup: 2020

References

1993 births
Living people
Egyptian footballers
Zamalek SC players
Association football central defenders